Federica Bonsignori (born 20 November 1967) is a former professional tennis player from Italy.

Biography
Bonsignori started competing professionally in 1984. 

She won her first Grand Slam match at the 1986 French Open when she had a double bagel win over Amanda Tobin. This was one of four occasions in her career that she reached the second round at Roland Garros, which was her best Grand Slam event. 

In 1987, she upset top seed Manuela Maleeva en route to the quarter-finals of the Belgian Open and reached the semi-finals of the Clarins Open in Paris.

Across 1988 and 1989, she had a minimal impact on tour, unable to progress past the second round in any WTA Tour tournament. 

Bonsignori won her only WTA tournament title at the 1990 Estoril Open. An unseeded player, she managed wins over three seeds, Angeliki Kanellopoulou, Isabel Cueto and Sabine Hack, before accounting for Laura Garrone in an all-Italian final.

She started 1991 by making the quarterfinals at Hilton Head, a run which included a win over top-10 player Katerina Maleeva. Following two more quarterfinal performances, in back to back WTA tournaments at Houston and Taranto, Bonsignori attained her highest ranking of 28 on 13 May 1991. 

A member of the Italy Federation Cup team in 1991, Bonsignori made a brief appearance in the World Group quarterfinal tie against Germany in Nottingham. With the Germans having secured the tie, Bonsignori made her tournament debut by partnering Linda Ferrando in a dead rubber. Their opponents, Anke Huber and Barbara Rittner retired from the match after only one game.

She was runner-up to Magdalena Maleeva at the 1992 San Marino Open and continued playing on tour until 1995.

WTA Tour finals

Singles (1 title, 1 runner-up)

ITF Circuit finals

Singles: 13 (4–9)

Doubles: 2 (0–2)

References

External links
 
 
 

1967 births
Living people
Italian female tennis players